Red Devil was an American progressive punk rock band, based in Philadelphia, Pennsylvania. Fond of odd time signatures and compositional elements, the band played a somewhat unusual brand of punk rock incorporating both heavy metal and pop punk. The band released two proper records and played a handful of shows throughout the Eastern US seaboard, the Midwest, and Southwest during its career.

Members
 Jon Foy - guitar, vocals
 Colin Smith - bass guitar, vocals
 Eleanor Buffam - vocals
 Chris 'Doc' Kulp - drums, vocals
 Michael 'Cappy' Helphen - guest tour drums

Discography

Proper releases
 Threats and Warnings (2006, self-released CD)
 Into the Sinking Ground (2007, Valiant Death Records, CD)

Limited-run releases
 demo (2005, self-released CD-r)
 Live on WKDU (2006, self-released CD-r)

External links
 Red Devil official website
 Red Devil at MySpace

Musical groups established in 2005
Musical groups disestablished in 2007